is a district located in Hiyama Subprefecture, Hokkaido, Japan.

As of 2004, the district has an estimated population of 21,896 and a density of 19.59 persons per km2. The total area is 1,117.57 km2.

Towns and villages
Assabu
Esashi
Kaminokuni

Notable place
 Katsuyama Date - A castle ruin,  was listed as one of the National Historic Site and Continued 100 Fine Castles of Japan.

References

Districts in Hokkaido